James Bower may refer to:

 Jamie Campbell Bower (born 1988), English actor, singer and former model
 James Bower (agrarian leader) (1860–1921), farmer and farm leader in western Canada
 James M. Bower (born 1954), American neuroscientist
 James Paterson Bower (1806–1889), Scottish Royal Navy admiral